Grant James Turner (born 11 March 1989 in Swindon) is a British swimmer. He competed for Great Britain in the 4 × 100 metre freestyle relay at the 2012 Summer Olympics.

Upon retirement from competitive swimming, Grant formed the Joanne Jackson Swim Academy with his partner Olympic swimmer Joanne Jackson. The Swim Academy offers the opportunity for all to develop their swimming skills with two former Olympic swimmers.

References

External links
JJSA Website

British male swimmers
Swimmers at the 2012 Summer Olympics
Olympic swimmers of Great Britain
Commonwealth Games medallists in swimming
1989 births
Living people
Sportspeople from Swindon
Commonwealth Games silver medallists for England
Swimmers at the 2010 Commonwealth Games
British male freestyle swimmers
Medallists at the 2010 Commonwealth Games